The IMM Graduate School is a privately owned educational institution and is part of the UXi Education group. The IMM Graduate School offers degrees, diplomas and certificates in marketing, marketing management and supply chain management.

The school provides most of its teaching through distance learning, but students can supplement their distanced learning by receiving academic support at one of their Student Support Centres throughout Southern Africa.

The IMM Graduate School has students from more than 20 different countries around the world, including Botswana, Congo, Kenya, Lesotho, Malawi, Mauritania, Mozambique, Namibia, Nigeria, Burundi, Sierra Leone, South Africa, Swaziland, Zambia, Zimbabwe, Bosnia, China, France, India, Ireland, Serbia, Thailand and the United Kingdom.

The current Executive Academic Head is Angela Bruwer.

Programmes
The IMM Graduate School is registered to offer the following programmes:

Undergraduate programmes:

 Higher Certificate in Marketing (SAQA ID: 86826)
 Higher Certificate in Export Management (SAQA ID: 79427)
 Higher Certificate in Supply Chain Management (SAQA ID: 117683)
 Diploma in Marketing Management (SAQA ID: 79546)
 Bachelor of Business Administration (BBA) in Marketing Management (SAQA ID: 80967)
 Bachelor of Commerce (BCom) in Marketing and Management Science (SAQA ID: 90737)
 Bachelor of Commerce (BCom) in International Supply Chain Management (SAQA ID: 110628)
 Bachelor of Commerce (BCom) Honours in Supply Chain Management (SAQA ID: 117085)

Postgraduate programmes:
 Postgraduate Diploma in Marketing Management (SAQA ID: 79846)
 Bachelor of Philosophy (BPhil) Honours in Marketing Management (SAQA ID: 79366)
 Masters of Philosophy (MPhil) in Marketing (SAQA ID: 86806)

Student support/regional offices 
The school's Student Support centres can be found in South Africa in Parktown, Johannesburg (Gauteng), Cape Town and Stellenbosch (Western Cape), and Durban (KwaZulu-Natal). Regional offices may be found in Harare, Zimbabwe.

Professional memberships
 Association of Private Providers of Education, Training and Development (APPETD) 
 National Association of Distance Education and Open Learning in South Africa ([NADEOSA) 
 Distance Education Association of South Africa (DEASA) 
 The Chartered Institute of Logistics and Transport (CILT)

Industry partnerships 
The IMM Graduate School is the only CIM accredited institution in South Africa. The Chartered Institute of Marketing (CIM) was founded in 1911. It has over 30,000 members, including more than 3,000 registered Chartered Marketers. CIM offers 130 study centres in 36 countries, and exam centres in 132 countries.

References

External links
 2022 prospectus

Universities and colleges in South Africa
Marketing education